Endothenia pauperculana is a moth of the family Tortricidae. It is found in France, Switzerland, Italy, Portugal, Spain and on Sardinia and the Canary Islands.

The wingspan is 11–13 mm. Adults have been recorded on wing in April and from June to July.

The larvae feed on Marrubium vulgare and Sideritis hirsuta.

References

Moths described in 1859
Endotheniini
Moths of Europe